The 1998–99 Spartan South Midlands Football League season was the 2nd in the history of Spartan South Midlands Football League.

Premier Division

At the end of the previous season regional Premier Division North and Premier Division South merged with the first ten clubs from both divisions to form new Premier Division. The Premier Division featured 23 clubs.

Ten clubs come from Premier Division North:
Arlesey Town
Brache Sparta
Buckingham Athletic
Harpenden Town
Hoddesdon Town
London Colney
Potters Bar Town
Royston Town
Toddington Rovers
Welwyn Garden City

Ten clubs come from Premier Division South:
Barkingside
Beaconsfield SYCOB
Brimsdown Rovers
Brook House
Haringey Borough
Hillingdon Borough
Islington St Mary's
Ruislip Manor
St Margaretsbury
Waltham Abbey

Two clubs promoted from the Senior Division:
Milton Keynes City, changed name from Mercedes Benz
New Bradwell St Peter

One club joined from the Herts County League:
Somersett Ambury V&E

League table

Senior Division

At the end of the previous season regional Premier Division North and Premier Division South merged with the first ten clubs from both divisions to form new Premier Division, while all other Premier divisions clubs relegated to the Senior Division. The Senior Division featured eleven clubs which competed in the division last season, along with eleven new clubs.

Five clubs relegated from Premier Division North:
Bedford United
Biggleswade Town
Langford
Letchworth
Milton Keynes

Four clubs relegated from Premier Division South:
Amersham Town
Cockfosters
Hanwell Town
Harefield United

Two clubs promoted from Division One North:
Greenacres
Luton Old Boys

At the end of the season Milton Keynes were renamed Bletchley Town.

League table

Division One

Division One featured eleven clubs which competed in previous season Division One North, along with six new clubs.
Three clubs relegated from the Senior Division:
Ampthill Town
Kent Athletic
The 61 FC Luton

Three new clubs:
Dunstable Town
Markyate
Newport Athletic

League table

References

External links
 FCHD Spartan South Midlands Football League page

1998–99
1998–99 in English football leagues